Wile E. Coyote and the Road Runner are a duo of cartoon characters from the Looney Tunes and Merrie Melodies series of animated cartoons, first appearing in 1949 in the theatrical cartoon short Fast and Furry-ous. In each episode, the cunning, devious and constantly hungry coyote repeatedly attempts to catch and subsequently eat the Road Runner, but is successful in catching the Road Runner (but not eating it) on only extremely rare occasions. Instead of his animal instincts, the coyote uses absurdly complex contraptions (generally in the manner of Rube Goldberg) to try to catch his prey, which comically backfire, with the coyote often getting injured in slapstick fashion. Many of the items for these contrivances are mail-ordered from a variety of companies implied to be part of the Acme Corporation.

One running gag involves the coyote trying, in vain, to shield himself with a little parasol against a great falling boulder that is about to crush him. Another involves him falling from high cliffs, after momentarily being suspended in midair—as if the fall is delayed until he realizes that there is nothing below him. The rest of the scene, shot from a bird's-eye view, shows him falling into a canyon so deep that his figure is eventually lost to sight, with only a small puff of dust indicating his impact. The coyote is notably a brilliant artist, capable of quickly painting incredibly lifelike renderings of such things as tunnels and roadside scenes, in further (and equally futile) attempts to deceive the bird.

The characters were created for Warner Bros. in 1948 by animation director Chuck Jones and writer Michael Maltese, with Maltese also setting the template for their adventures. The characters star in a long-running series of theatrical cartoon shorts (the first 16 of which were written by Maltese) and occasional made-for-television cartoons. Originally meant to parody chase-cartoon characters like Tom and Jerry, they became popular in their own right.

The coyote appears separately as an occasional antagonist of Bugs Bunny in five shorts from 1952 to 1963: Operation: Rabbit, To Hare Is Human, Rabbit's Feat, Compressed Hare, and Hare-Breadth Hurry. While he is generally silent in the Wile E. Coyote – Road Runner shorts, he speaks with a refined accent in these solo outings (except for Hare-Breadth Hurry), beginning with 1952's Operation: Rabbit, introducing himself as "Wile E. Coyote, Genius", voiced by Mel Blanc. Wile E. Coyote additionally speaks in the 1965 short Zip Zip Hooray!, where he explains his desire to eat the Road Runner.  The Road Runner vocalizes only with his signature "beep, beep" sound, recorded by Paul Julian and an accompanying "popping-cork" tongue sound.

By 2020, 50 cartoons had been made featuring the characters (including the four CGI shorts), the majority by creator Chuck Jones.

TV Guide included Wile E. Coyote in its 2013 list of "The 60 Nastiest Villains of All Time".

Creation
Jones based the coyote on Mark Twain's book Roughing It, in which Twain described the coyote as "a long, slim, sick and sorry-looking skeleton" that is "a living, breathing allegory of Want. He is always hungry." Jones said he created the Wile E. Coyote-Road Runner cartoons as a parody of traditional "cat and mouse" cartoons such as MGM's Tom and Jerry. Jones modelled the coyote's appearance on fellow animator Ken Harris.

The coyote's name of Wile E. is a pun of the word "wily." The "E" stands for "Ethelbert" in one issue of a Looney Tunes comic book. The coyote's surname is routinely pronounced with a long "e", but in one cartoon short, To Hare Is Human, Wile E. is heard pronouncing it with a diphthong. Early model sheets for the character prior to his initial appearance (in Fast and Furry-ous) identified him as "Don Coyote", a pun on Don Quixote.

The Road Runner's "beep, beep sound" was inspired by background artist Paul Julian's imitation of a car horn. Julian voiced the various recordings of the phrase used throughout the Road Runner cartoons, although on-screen he was uncredited for his work. According to animation historian Michael Barrier, Julian's preferred spelling of the sound effect was either "hmeep hmeep" or "mweep, mweep".

List of cartoons

The series consists of:
 50 shorts, mostly about 6 to 7 minutes long, but including four web cartoons which are "three-minute, three-dimensional cartoons in widescreen (scope)".
 One half-hour special released theatrically (26 minutes).
 One feature-length film that combines live action and animation

1 Re-edited from Adventures of the Road Runner by Chuck Jones and with new music direction from Bill Lava
2 Re-edited from Adventures of the Road Runner by DePatie–Freleng Enterprises
3 These cartoons were each shown with a feature-length film. Chariots of Fur was shown with Richie Rich, Coyote Falls was shown with Cats & Dogs: The Revenge of Kitty Galore, Fur of Flying was shown with Legend of the Guardians: The Owls of Ga'Hoole, and Rabid Rider was shown with Yogi Bear.
Flash in the Pain was shown at the Annecy International Animated Film Festival on June 10, 2014.

Scenery

The desert scenery in the first three Road Runner cartoons, Fast and Furry-ous (1949), Beep, Beep (1952), and Going! Going! Gosh! (also 1952), was designed by Robert Gribbroek and was quite realistic. In most later cartoons, the scenery was designed by Maurice Noble and was far more abstract. It is based on the deserts of the Southwestern United States.

Acme Corporation

Wile E. Coyote often obtains various complex and ludicrous devices from a mail-order company, the fictitious Acme Corporation, which he hopes will help him catch the Road Runner. The devices invariably fail in improbable and spectacular fashion.

In August, September and October 1982, the National Lampoon published a three-part series chronicling the lawsuit Wile E. filed against the Acme Corporation over the faulty items they sold him in his pursuit of the Road Runner. Even though the Road Runner appeared as a witness for the plaintiff, the coyote still lost the suit.

Laws and rules
In his book Chuck Amuck: The Life and Times of an Animated Cartoonist, Chuck Jones claimed that he and the artists behind the Road Runner and Wile E. Coyote cartoons adhered to some simple but strict rules:
 "The Road Runner cannot harm the Coyote except by going ‘Beep-Beep!’" This only applies to direct harm; however, the Road Runner is able to indirectly harm Wile E. One of the most common instances of indirect harm was done with a startling "Beep-Beep" that ends up either sending Wile E. off a cliff or up in the air and through a rock above him. Rule 1 was broken twice, once in Clippety Clobbered when the Road Runner drops a boulder on the coyote after painting it with "invisible paint", and again in the episode 'Out and Out Rout' when the Road Runner runs over the Coyote with a steam roller.  This rule has also been broken in several CGI shorts from The Looney Tunes Show. 
 "No outside force can harm the Coyote — only his own ineptitude or the failure of the Acme products." Trains and trucks were the exceptions from time to time, as well as the desert environment (boulders, cacti, etc.)
 "The Coyote could stop anytime — if he were not a fanatic. (Repeat: ‘A fanatic is one who redoubles his effort when he has forgotten his aim.’ — George Santayana)."
 "No dialogue ever, except 'Beep-Beep!'" Various onomatopoeic exclamations (such as yelping in pain) are seemingly not considered dialogue. This rule was violated in some cartoons, such as in Zoom at the Top where the Coyote says the word "Ouch." after he gets hurt in a bear trap, as well as in shorts such as Adventures of the Road Runner, which do not follow the standard formula. Typically, Wile E. Coyote communicates by holding up one or more signs that read such phrases as "In Heaven's name… [[Chariots of Fur|what am I doing?]]", "How about ending this cartoon before I hit?" and "Okay, wise guys, you always wanted me to catch him / Now what do I do?", among others. The Road Runner sometimes does this too, having used signs with such phrases as "Road Runners can't read", "Road Runners can't read and don't drink", "I've already got a date", "Road Runners already have feathers", and "I just don't have the heart"/"Bye!", among others. 
 "The Road Runner must stay on the road — otherwise, logically, he would not be called a Road Runner." This rule was broken in several shorts, including cactus patches, mines, cliff edges, mountain tops and railways.
 "All action must be confined to the natural environment of the two characters — the southwest American desert." This rule was broken in Freeze Frame, when Wile E. discovers that Road Runners hate snow and ice and chases the Road Runner onto a snowy summit. In another episode War and Pieces the Coyote tries to catch the Road Runner by riding a rocket; instead he ends up going through the ground and ends up in China. 
 "All materials tools, weapons, or mechanical conveniences must be obtained from the Acme Corporation." However, there have been instances in which Wile E. utilizes products not obtained from Acme. Amongst other examples, in Rushing Roulette, the Coyote uses AJAX Stix-All glue. In Zip 'N Snort, aside from the Acme Iron Pellets, Wile E. also had a box of AJAX Bird Seed. 
 "Whenever possible, make gravity the Coyote's greatest enemy." For example, falling off a cliff.
 "The Coyote is always more humiliated than harmed by his failures."

These rules were not always followed, and in an interview years after the series was made, principal writer of the original 16 episodes Michael Maltese stated he had never heard of these or any "rules" and dismissed them as "post production observation".

As in other cartoons, the Road Runner and the coyote follow certain laws of cartoon physics, peculiar to an animation universe. Some examples:
 Animation vs. Reality Mixing: the Road Runner has the ability to enter the painted image of a cave, while the coyote cannot (unless there is an opening through which he can fall). Sometimes, however, this is reversed, and the Road Runner can burst through a painting of a broken bridge and continue on his way, while the coyote will instead enter the painting and fall down the precipice of the cliff where the bridge is out.
 Gravity: sometimes the coyote is allowed to hang in mid-air until he realizes that he is about to plummet into a chasm (a process occasionally referred to elsewhere as Road-Runnering or a Wile E. Coyote moment). The coyote can overtake rocks (or cannons) which fall earlier than he does, and end up being squashed by them. If a chase sequence runs over the edge of a cliff, the Road Runner is not affected by gravity, whereas the coyote will be subject to normal Earth gravity and eventually fall to the ground below. The Road Runner can also stand upon a platform suspended in midair (such as a hole cut out from a bridge by the coyote) where gravity instead causes everything but that one cut-out area to plummet to the ground.
 The Road Runner is able to run fast enough to go through time.
 If the coyote uses an explosive (commonly dynamite) that is triggered by a mechanism that is supposed to force the explosive in a forward motion toward its target, the actual mechanism itself will shoot forward, leaving the explosive behind to detonate in the coyote's face.  On occasion, the explosive sometimes explodes either too early or too late with the Coyote being caught in the explosion (this gag also appeared in other Looney Tunes series).
 Delayed Reaction: (a) a complex apparatus that is supposed to propel an object like a boulder or steel ball forward, or trigger a trap, will not work on the Road Runner, but always does so perfectly on the coyote - when he inspects it after its failure to ensnare the Road Runner. (b) the Road Runner can jump up and down on the trigger of a large animal trap and eat the intended trap trigger bird seed off it and leave unharmed without setting off the trap; but when the coyote places the tiniest droplet of oil on the trigger, the trap snaps shut on him without fail.
 On other occasions, the coyote dons an exquisite Acme costume or propulsion device that briefly allows him to catch up to the Road Runner, but ultimately always results in him losing track of his proximity to large cliffs or walls, and while the Road Runner darts around an extremely sharp turn near a cliff, defying physics, the coyote succumbs to physics and will rocket right over the edge and plummet spectacularly to the ground.
 In what might be called cartoon biology, the Road Runner always runs faster than the coyote, whilst in reality, a coyote can outrun a greater roadrunner.

Both animals were typically introduced in a similar fashion; the action would slow to a halt, and a caption would appear with both their common name and a mock genus/species name in pseudo-Latin (for example, in Zoom at the Top, the Road Runner was classified as "Disappearialis Quickius", while the coyote was identified as "Overconfidentii Vulgaris").

Later cartoons
The original Chuck Jones productions ended in 1963 after Jack L. Warner closed the Warner Bros. animation studio. War and Pieces, the last Wile E. Coyote/Road Runner short directed by Jones, was released on June 6, 1964. By that time, David H. DePatie and director Friz Freleng had formed DePatie–Freleng Enterprises, moved into the facility just emptied by Warner, and signed a license with Warner Bros. to produce cartoons for the big studio to distribute.

Their first cartoon to feature the Road Runner was The Wild Chase, directed by Freleng in 1965. The premise was a race between the bird and "the fastest mouse in all Mexico," Speedy Gonzales, with the coyote and Sylvester the Cat each trying to make a meal out of their respective usual targets. Much of the material was animation rotoscoped from earlier Road Runner and Speedy Gonzales shorts, with the other characters added in.

In total, DePatie-Freleng produced 14 Road Runner cartoons, two of which were directed by Robert McKimson (Rushing Roulette (1965) and Sugar and Spies (1966)). Eleven of these shorts, directed by Rudy Larriva (often referred to as the "Larriva Eleven"), were subcontracted to Format Films and suffered from severe budget cuts; due to a significant drop in the number of frames used per second in animation, the "Larriva Eleven" were somewhat cheap-looking and jerky. The music was also of poorer quality than the older features; this was a by-product of music director Bill Lava (who had replaced the recently deceased Milt Franklyn three years prior) being relegated to the use of pre-composed music cues - due to the previously mentioned budget cuts - rather than a proper score, as heard with The Wild Chase, Rushing Roulette, and Run Run, Sweet Road Runner (the third being the only one of the "Larriva Eleven" to have a proper score). These 11 shorts have been considered inferior to the other Golden Age shorts, garnering mixed to poor reviews from critics. In Of Mice and Magic, Leonard Maltin calls the series "witless in every sense of the word." In addition, except for the planet Earth scene at the tail end of "Highway Runnery", there was only one clip of the coyote's fall to the ground, used over and over again. Jones' previously described "laws" for the characters were not followed with any significant fidelity, nor were Latin phrases used when introducing the characters.

Spin-offs

In another series of Warner Bros. Looney Tunes cartoons, Chuck Jones used the character design (model sheets and personality) of Wile E. Coyote as "Ralph Wolf". In this series, Ralph continually attempts to steal sheep from a flock being guarded by the eternally vigilant Sam Sheepdog. As with the Road Runner and Wile E. Coyote series, Ralph Wolf uses all sorts of wild inventions and schemes to steal the sheep, but he is continually foiled by the sheepdog. In a move seen by many as a self-referential gag, Ralph Wolf continually tries to steal the sheep not because he is a fanatic (as Wile E. Coyote was), but because it is his job. In every cartoon, he and Sam Sheepdog punch a timeclock and exchange pleasantries, go to work, stop what they are doing to take a lunch break, go back to work and pick up right where they left off, and clock out to go home for the day and exchange pleasantries again, all according to a factory-like blowing whistle. The most obvious difference between the coyote and the wolf, aside from their locales, is that Wile E. has a black nose and Ralph has a red nose.

Comic books
Wile E. Coyote was called Kelsey Coyote in his comic book debut, a Henery Hawk story in Looney Tunes and Merrie Melodies #91 (May 1949). He only made a couple of other appearances at this time and did not have his official name yet, as it was not used until 1952 (in Operation: Rabbit, his second appearance).

The first appearance of the Road Runner in a comic book was in Bugs Bunny Vacation Funnies #8 (August 1958) published by Dell Comics. The feature is titled "Beep Beep the Road Runner" and the story "Desert Dessert". It presents itself as the first meeting between Beep Beep and Wile E. (whose mailbox reads "Wile E. Coyote, Inventor and Genius"), and introduces the Road Runner's wife, Matilda, and their three newly hatched sons (though Matilda soon disappeared from the comics). This story established the convention that the Road Runner family talked in rhyme, a convention that also appeared in early children's book adaptations of the cartoons.

Dell initially published a dedicated "Beep Beep the Road Runner" comic as part of Four Color Comics #918, 1008, and 1046 before launching a separate series for the character numbered #4–14 (1960–1962), with the three try-out issues counted as the first three numbers. After a hiatus, Gold Key Comics took over the character with issues #1–88 (1966–1984). During the 1960s, the artwork was done by Pete Alvarado and Phil DeLara; from 1966 to 1969, the Gold Key issues consisted of Dell reprints. Afterward, new stories began to appear, initially drawn by Alvarado and De Lara before Jack Manning became the main artist for the title. New and reprinted Beep Beep stories also appeared in Golden Comics Digest and Gold Key's revival of Looney Tunes in the 1970s. During this period, Wile E.'s middle name was revealed to be "Ethelbert" in the story "The Greatest of E's" in issue #53 (cover-dated September 1975) of Gold Key Comics' licensed comic book Beep Beep the Road Runner.

The Road Runner and Wile E. Coyote also make appearances in the DC Comics Looney Tunes title. Wile E. was able to speak in some of his appearances in the DC comics.

In 2017, DC Comics featured a Looney Tunes and DC Comics crossovers that reimagined the characters in a darker style. The Road Runner and Wile E. Coyote had a crossover with the intergalactic bounty hunter Lobo in Lobo/Road Runner Special #1. In this version, the Road Runner, Wile E., and other Looney Tunes characters are reimagined as standard animals who were experimented upon with alien DNA at Acme to transform them into their cartoon forms. In the back-up story, done in more traditional cartoon style, Lobo tries to hunt down the Road Runner, but is limited by Bugs to be more kid-friendly in his language and approach.

Television
The Road Runner and the coyote appeared on Saturday mornings as the stars of their own TV series, The Road Runner Show, from September 1966 to September 1968, on CBS. At this time it was merged with The Bugs Bunny Show to become The Bugs Bunny and Road Runner Show, running from 1968 to 1985. The show was later seen on ABC until 2000, and on Global until 2001.

In the 1970s, Chuck Jones directed some Wile E. Coyote/Road Runner short films for the educational children's TV series The Electric Company. These short cartoons used the coyote and the Road Runner to display words for children to read.

In 1979, Freeze Frame, in which Jones moved the chase from the desert to snow-covered mountains, was seen as part of Bugs Bunny's Looney Christmas Tales.

At the end of Bugs Bunny's Portrait of the Artist as a Young Bunny (the initial sequence of Chuck Jones' TV special Bugs Bunny's Bustin' Out All Over), Bugs mentions to the audience that he and Elmer may have been the first pair of characters to have chase scenes in these cartoons, but then a pint-sized baby Wile E. Coyote (wearing a diaper and holding a small knife and fork) runs right in front of Bugs, chasing a gold-colored, mostly unhatched (except for the tail, which is sticking out) Road Runner egg, which is running rapidly while some high-pitched "Beep, beep" noises can be heard. This was followed by the full-fledged Road Runner/Wile E. Coyote short Soup or Sonic. Earlier in that story, while kid Elmer was falling from a cliff, Wile E. Coyote's adult self tells him to move over and leave falling to people who know how to do it and then he falls, followed by Elmer.

In the 1980s, ABC began showing many Warner Bros. shorts, but in highly edited form. Many scenes integral to the stories were taken out, including scenes in which Wile E. Coyote landed at the bottom of the canyon after having fallen from a cliff, or had a boulder or anvil actually make contact with him. In almost all WB animated features, scenes where a character's face was burnt and black, some thought resembling blackface, were removed, as were animated characters smoking cigarettes. Some cigar smoking scenes were left in. The unedited versions of these shorts (with the exception of ones with blackface) were not seen again until Cartoon Network, and later Boomerang, began showing them again in the 1990s and early 2000s. Since the release of the WB library of cartoons on DVD, the cartoons gradually disappeared from television, presumably to increase sales of the DVDs. However, Cartoon Network began to air them again in 2011, coinciding with the premiere of The Looney Tunes Show (2011), and the shorts were afterwards moved to Boomerang, where they have remained to this day.

Wile E. Coyote and the Road Runner appeared in several episodes of Tiny Toon Adventures. In this series, Wile E. (voiced in the Jim Reardon episode "Piece of Mind" by Joe Alaskey) was the dean of Acme Looniversity and the mentor of Calamity Coyote. The Road Runner's protégé in this series was Little Beeper. In the episode "Piece of Mind", Wile E. narrates the life story of Calamity while Calamity is falling from the top of a tall skyscraper. In the direct-to-video film Tiny Toon Adventures: How I Spent My Vacation, the Road Runner finally gets a taste of humiliation by getting run over by a mail truck that "brakes for coyotes."

The two were also seen in cameos in Animaniacs. They were together in two Slappy Squirrel cartoons: "Bumbie's Mom" and "Little Old Slappy from Pasadena". In the latter, the Road Runner gets another taste of humiliation when he is out-run by Slappy's car, and holds up a sign saying "I quit" — immediately afterward, Buttons, who was launched into the air during a previous gag, lands squarely on top of him. Wile E. appears without the bird in a The Wizard of Oz parody, dressed in his batsuit from one short, in a twister (tornado) funnel in "Buttons in Ows". Also, in the beginning of one episode, an artist is seen drawing the Road Runner.

In a Cartoon Network TV ad about The Acme Hour, Wile E. Coyote utilized a pair of jet roller skates to catch the Road Runner and (quite surprisingly) did not fail. While he was cooking his prey, it was revealed that the roller skates came from a generic brand. The ad said that other brand is not the same thing.

The Road Runner appears in an episode of the 1991 series Taz-Mania, in which Taz grabs him by the leg and gets ready to eat him, until the two gators are ready to capture Taz, so he lets the Road Runner go. In another episode of Taz-Mania, the Road Runner cartoons are parodied, with Taz dressed as the Road Runner and the character Willy Wombat dressed as Wile E. Coyote. Willy tries to catch Taz with Acme Roller Skates but fails, and Taz even says "Beep, beep".

Wile E. and the Road Runner appeared in their toddler versions in Baby Looney Tunes, but only in songs. However, they both had made a cameo in the episode "Are We There Yet?", where the Road Runner was seen out the window of Floyd's car with Wile E. chasing him.

Wile E. Coyote had a cameo as the true identity of an alien hunter (a parody of Predator) in the Duck Dodgers episode "K-9 Quarry," voiced by Dee Bradley Baker. In that episode, he was hunting Martian Commander X-2 and K-9. He is also temporary as a member of Agent Roboto's Legion of Duck Doom from the previous season in another episode.

In Loonatics Unleashed, Wile E. Coyote and the Road Runner's 28th century descendants are Tech E. Coyote (voiced by Kevin Michael Richardson) and Rev Runner (voiced by Rob Paulsen). Tech E. Coyote was the tech expert of the Loonatics (influenced by the past cartoons with many of the machines ordered by Wile E. from Acme), and has magnetic hands and the ability to molecularly regenerate himself (influenced by the many times in which Wile E. painfully failed to capture the Road Runner and then was shown to have miraculously recovered). Tech E. Coyote speaks, but does not have a British accent as Wile E. Coyote did. Rev Runner is also able to talk, though extremely rapidly, and can fly without the use of jet packs, which are used by other members of the Loonatics. He also has sonic speed, also a take-off of the Road Runner. The pair get on rather well, despite the number of gadgets Tech designs in order to stop Rev from talking; also they have their moments where they do not get along. When friendship is shown it is often only from Rev to Tech, not the other way around; this could, however, be attributed to the fact that Tech has only the barest minimum of social skills. They are both portrayed as smart, but Tech is the better inventor and at times Rev is shown doing stupid things. References to their ancestors' past are seen in the episode "Family Business" where the other Road Runners are wary of Tech and Tech relives the famous falling gags done in the Wile E. Coyote/Road Runner shorts.

The Road Runner and Wile E. Coyote feature in 3D computer animated cartoons or cartoon animation in the Cartoon Network TV series The Looney Tunes Show. The CGI shorts were only included in Season 1, but Wile E. and the Road Runner still appeared throughout the series in 2D animation.

Wile E. Coyote also appears in the TV series Wabbit, voiced by JP Karliak, in a similar vein to his previous pairings with Bugs Bunny. He appears as Bugs' annoying know-it-all neighbor who always uses his inventions to compete with Bugs. The Road Runner began making appearances when the series was renamed New Looney Tunes in 2017.

Wile E. Coyote and the Road Runner both appear in their own cartoon shorts in the HBO Max streaming series Looney Tunes Cartoons.

Wile E. Coyote and the Road Runner make occasional appearances in the preschool educational series Bugs Bunny Builders. Wile E. (voiced by Keith Ferguson) often helps the Looney Builders out with their plans, often using some of his inventions. In the episode "Looney Science", Wile E. has the Looney Builders build him a science museum to show off his inventions, but the Road Runner keeps constantly distracting him. 

Wile E. Coyote was also in an episode of Night Court (Season 7, Episode 22: Sill Another Day in the Life) in which Judge Harold T. Stone (Harry Anderson) found him guilty of harassment and told him to leave the poor bird alone.

3-D shorts
The characters appeared in seven 3-D shorts attached to Warner Bros. features. Three have been screened with features, while the rest serve as segments in season 1 of The Looney Tunes Show. A short called Flash in the Pain was shown on the web in 2014, but was not shown in theaters until 2016, when the movie Storks premiered.

Film
Warner Bros. is developing a live-action/animation hybrid film centered on Wile E. Coyote titled Coyote vs. Acme, produced by Warner Animation Group, with The Lego Batman Movie director Chris McKay on board to produce. The film is said to be based on The New Yorker short story "Coyote v. Acme" by author Ian Frazier. Published in 1990, the piece imagined a lawsuit brought about by Wile E. Coyote against the Acme Company who provided him with various devices and tools to aid in his pursuit of the Road Runner. The devices frequently malfunctioned, leading to the humorous failures, injuries, and sight gags the Road Runner cartoons are known for. Jon and Josh Silberman were originally set to write the screenplay. On December 18, 2019, it was reported that Dave Green will direct the project. It was also reported that the project is looking for a new writer, with Jon and Josh Silberman instead co-producing the film alongside McKay; however, by December 2020, McKay departed the project while Jon and Josh Silberman left their roles as producers and resumed their screenwriting roles, with Samy Burch, Jeremy Slater, and James Gunn also writing the film. Gunn will also co-produce the project alongside Chris DeFaria. It was also announced that the film is scheduled to be released on July 21, 2023. In February 2022, it was announced that John Cena would star in the film. In March 2022, Will Forte and Lana Condor were added to the cast.

Voice actors
Wile E. Coyote
 Mel Blanc (1952–1989)
 Paul Julian (imitating the Road Runner in Zipping Along, Ready, Set, Zoom!, The Road Runner Show bumper and Road Runner's Death Valley Rally)
 Joe Alaskey (Tiny Toon Adventures, Judge Granny)
 Keith Scott (Spectacular Light and Show Illuminanza, The Looney Tunes Radio Show)
 Bob Bergen (Bugs Bunny's Learning Adventures)
 Seth MacFarlane (Family Guy, Seth MacFarlane's Cavalcade of Cartoon Comedy)
 Dee Bradley Baker (Duck Dodgers)
 Maurice LaMarche (Looney Tunes: Cartoon Conductor)
 Jess Harnell (The Drawn Together Movie: The Movie!)
 James Arnold Taylor (Scooby Doo and Looney Tunes: Cartoon Universe) 
 JP Karliak (New Looney Tunes)
 Martin Starr (Robot Chicken)
 Eric Bauza (Looney Tunes: World of Mayhem, Coyote vs. Acme)
 Keith Ferguson (Bugs Bunny Builders)

The Road Runner
The voice artist Paul Julian originated the character's voice. Before and after his death, his voice was appearing in various media, for example, in TV series, shorts and video games, such as 2014's Looney Tunes Dash. In addition, other voice actors have replaced him. These voice actors are:

 Mel Blanc (1964 Greeting Card Record, The New Adventures of Bugs Bunny (1973), Four More Adventures of Bugs Bunny (1974), Looney Tunes Talking Character Wall Clock)
 Keith Scott (Road Runner Roller Coaster commercial, The Looney Tunes Radio Show)
 Joe Alaskey (Looney Tunes: Cartoon Conductor)
 Kevin Shinick (Mad)
 Seth Green (Robot Chicken) 
 Eric Bauza (Looney Tunes: World of Mayhem)

Video games
Several Wile E. Coyote and the Road Runner-themed video games have been produced:

 Road Runner (arcade game by Atari, later ported to the Commodore 64, NES, Atari 2600, and several PC platforms)
 Electronic Road Runner (self-contained LCD game from Tiger Electronics released in 1990)
 Looney Tunes (Game Boy game by Sunsoft).
 The Bugs Bunny Crazy Castle (NES/Game Boy game by Kemco)
 The Bugs Bunny Crazy Castle 2 (Game Boy game by Kemco)
 The Bugs Bunny Birthday Blowout (NES game by Kemco)
 Road Runner's Death Valley Rally (Super NES game by Sunsoft)
 Wile E. Coyote's Revenge (Super NES game by Sunsoft)
 Desert Speedtrap (Sega Game Gear and Sega Master System game by Sega/Probe Software)
 Bugs Bunny: Crazy Castle 3 (Game Boy game by Kemco)
 Desert Demolition (Sega Mega Drive/Genesis game by Sega/BlueSky Software)
 Sheep, Dog, 'n' Wolf (for the original PlayStation and published by Infogrames, actually based on the Ralph Wolf and Sam Sheepdog cartoons, but the Road Runner does make two cameo appearances)
 Looney Tunes B-Ball (Wile E. is a playable character)
 Space Jam Looney Tunes Racing (Wile E. is a playable character. The Road Runner is also seen in the game as a non-playable character.)
 Taz Express (Nintendo 64) game published by Infogrames (Wile E is an antagonist)
 Taz: Wanted (Wile E. appears)
 Looney Tunes: Back in Action (published by Electronic Arts)
 Looney Tunes Double Pack (published by Majesco Entertainment, developed by WayForward Technologies, where "Acme Antics" is the Wile E. Coyote and the Road Runner half of the double pack)
 Looney Tunes: Space Race (Wile E. is a playable character)
 Looney Tunes Acme Arsenal (Wile E. has his own level in the PS2 version)
 Looney Tunes: Cartoon Conductor Looney Tunes Dash (iOS and Android game)
 Looney Tunes: World of Mayhem (iOS and Android game)

In popular culture

There are two scenes in Stanley Kubrick's 1980 adaptation of The Shining where Danny Torrance and his mother, Wendy Torrance, are watching the cartoons.

Wile E. Coyote and the Road Runner appeared in the 1988 Touchstone/Amblin film Who Framed Roger Rabbit. They are first seen silhouetted by the elevator doors in Toontown, and then in full in the ACME Factory during the final scene with other characters.

The 1979 Western comedy film The Villain is a tribute to the cartoons, reconstructing several famous gags in live action.

In the 1992 film Under Siege, "Road Runner" is the code name of the renegade former CIA operative William Strannix, played by Tommy Lee Jones, in a reference to the fact that the character is never captured. 

Wile E. Coyote has appeared twice in Family Guy: his first episode, "I Never Met the Dead Man", depicts him riding in a car with Peter Griffin; when Peter runs over the Road Runner and asks if he hit "that ostrich", Wile E. tells him to keep going. His second appearance was in "PTV", in which Wile E. attempts to get a refund for a giant-sized slingshot at an ACME retailer where Peter works.

Wile E. Coyote and the Road Runner appeared in Seth MacFarlane's Cavalcade of Cartoon Comedy in the short "Die, Sweet Roadrunner, Die". In this short, Wile E. crushes the Road Runner with a large boulder and eats him, but then struggles to find purpose in life, having not trained for anything else other than chasing the Road Runner. Ultimately, after a short-lived job as a waiter in a local diner, and a suicide attempt (by way of catapulting himself into a mountain at close range), Wile E. finally realizes what he is to do with his life, and reveals he is now an advocate for Christianity.

Both Wile E. Coyote and the Road Runner have appeared in Robot Chicken on multiple occasions. One sketch sees Wile E. faking his own suicide and then torching the Road Runner with a flamethrower when he shows up at Wile E.'s "funeral". Another sketch shows Wile E. teaching a college course on how to get away with murder, using the Road Runner's murder as an example; the students trace the mail orders for the ACME products used to commit the murder to Wile E., who is executed by electric chair for the crime. Another sketch sees Wile E. presenting his iconic "fake tunnel" at an art auction, and another reveals why Wile E.'s ACME products always fail - the ACME Corporation is run by multiple Road Runners.

Guitarist Mark Knopfler recorded a song called "Coyote" in homage to the cartoon shows of Wile E. Coyote and the Road Runner on the 2002 album The Ragpicker's Dream. The Tom Smith song "Operation: Desert Storm", which won a Pegasus award for Best Fool Song in 1999, is about the different ways the coyote's plans fail.

The music video for Twisted Sister's signature song "We're Not Gonna Take It" was based heavily on the cartoon.

Humorist Ian Frazier created the mock-legal prose piece "Coyote v. Acme", which is included in a book of the same name.

During a scene in The Drawn Together Movie: The Movie!, the Drawn Together'' cast accidentally run over and kill the Road Runner with Foxxy Love's van. Upon noticing this, Wile E. Coyote runs up to the Road Runner's corpse and declares "Without you, my life really has no meaning", before shooting himself with a "Bang!" flag gun.

See also

 Coyotes in popular culture
 Coyote (mythology)
 Road Runner High Speed Online
 Calamity Coyote
 Little Beeper
 Plymouth Road Runner
 Arizona Coyotes, an NHL team whose AHL affiliate is the Tucson Roadrunners

References

External links
 Wile E. Coyote on IMDb
 Road Runner on IMDb
 Wile E. Coyote at Don Markstein's Toonopedia. Archived from the original on January 19, 2017.
 Road Runner at Don Markstein's Toonopedia. Archived from the original on January 19, 2017.
 Looney Tunes—Stars of the Show: Wile E. Coyote and Road Runner (official studio site)
 "That WASN'T All, Folks!: Warner Bros. Cartoons 1964–1969", by Jon Cooke
 All about Wile E. Coyote on Chuck Jones Official Website.
 All about Road Runner on Chuck Jones Official Website.

 
Animated duos
Dell Comics titles
Film characters introduced in 1949
Fictional characters who break the fourth wall
Fictional rivalries
Gold Key Comics titles
Looney Tunes characters
Fictional mute characters